A meow or miaow is a cat vocalization. Meows may have diverse tones and are sometimes chattered, murmured or whispered. Adult cats rarely meow to each other, so an adult cat meowing to human beings is probably a post-domestication extension of meowing by kittens: a call for attention.

The meow can be assertive, plaintive, friendly, bold, welcoming, attention-soliciting, demanding, or complaining. It can even be silent, where the cat opens its mouth but does not vocalize. Just as humans may verbalize exhaustively when they are happy, so can cats. According to The Purrington Post, a chatty cat is likely happy too.

A mew is a high-pitched meow often produced by kittens. It is apparently used to solicit attention from the kitten's mother, and adult cats may use it as well. The mew is similar to what is described in Brown et al. 1978 as an isolation call. By around three to four weeks of age kittens do not mew when at least one littermate is present, and at four to five months of age kittens stop mewing altogether.

Spelling
In American English, the spelling "meow" was first used in 1842. Before that, the word could be spelled "miaow", "miau", or "meaw". Of any variant, the earliest attestation of a cat's cry in Early Modern English is from the 1630s.

Language differences
The following table lists the onomatopoeic word for the "miau" or "meow" sound in various languages.

See also

 Cat communication
 Cross-linguistic onomatopoeias
 Devocalization
 Jingle Cats
 Meow the Jewels, a hip-hop album by Run the Jewels with all instrumentals replaced with meowing
 Miao (disambiguation)

References

Animal sounds
Cat behavior
Onomatopoeia